Nobutomo (written: 信友) is a masculine Japanese given name. Notable people with the name include:

 (1531–1575), Japanese samurai
 (1506–1561), Japanese samurai
 (died 1535), Japanese samurai
 (1516–1555), Japanese daimyō

Japanese masculine given names